Lucifera is an anti-heroine of the eponymous 1970s Italian comic book, published between 1971 and 1980 by Ediperiodici. The series, along with more well-known series of the era like Isabella and Goldrake, is among those created by Renzo Barbieri and Giorgio Cavedon, published between the late sixties and early seventies. The series led to the birth and development of the Italian erotic genre.

Publication history 
The Lucifera comic book was published by Ediperiodici and ran for 170 issues from 1971 to 1980. A French edition was also published by Elvifrance and ran for 99 issues from 1972 to 1980.

Lucifera is one of many similar female characters from the Italian fumetti tradition. Other figures from the same era, and with similarly violent or erotic preoccupations, include Zora la Vampira, Maghella, Biancaneve, Vartan, Jacula, Jolanda de Almaviva, Yra,  and Sukia.

Ediperiodici, later Edifumetto, published the series, brought with it the birth of the dark erotic genre, and monopolized the market. Other characters with similar characteristics to Lucifera are Zora, Maghella, Biancaneve, Vartan, and Sukia.

Artists who have worked on the Lucifera series include Edoardo Morricone (also known as Morrik, who later worked on other Italian comics such as Biancaneve, Satanik and Djustine), Leone Frollo and Tito Marchioro.

Plot 
Lucifera is a demoness/succubus dedicated to fighting the forces of Goodness. A frequent visitor to Hell, she also enjoys sending others there to be tormented. Her adventures are full of quite explicit, if humorous, eroticism and in one memorable scene she is shown fellating the devil himself. Other storylines involve sado-masochism, executions, impalement and even molestation by a giant spider.

On the surface world she seems to inhabit a mythical and very violent Europe from the Middle Ages - populated by wenches, knights, and three-headed dragon dogs.

Note 

Italian comics titles
1971 comics debuts
1980 comics endings
Fantasy comics
Erotic comics
Fictional demons and devils
Fictional medieval European people
Hell in popular culture
Comics set in the Middle Ages
Comics about women
Italian comics characters
Female characters in comics